The Opelika-Auburn News is a daily newspaper in Alabama, serving Opelika, Auburn, and the surrounding communities.

History
The newspaper began as the weekly Opelika Industrial News, on September 11, 1890. 

On May 30, 1904, the newspaper began publication as the Opelika Daily News. 

In 1968, Millard B. Grimes and investors purchased the paper, changing its name to the Opelika-Auburn News in 1969, and then selling it in 1977. It was owned by the Thomson Corporation until 2000, when it was sold to Media General. 

In 1995, the News was awarded "Most Improved Daily Newspaper" by the Alabama Press Association and that year the parent company purchased the competing Auburn Bulletin and Lee County Eagle. 

In the early 2000s, the News was a member of a coalition of newspapers which brought suit against Auburn University to uncover financial misbehavior by trustees. 

In 2012, Media General sold most of its newspapers, including the Opelika-Auburn News, to Berkshire Hathaway. Lee Enterprises purchased the newspaper in 2020.

Awards

2018 Better Newspaper Contest - Alabama Press Association

References

External links 
 
 
 

1890 establishments in Alabama
Newspapers published in Alabama
Auburn, Alabama
Lee County, Alabama
Lee Enterprises publications
Daily newspapers published in the United States
Newspapers established in 1890